Operation Hummingbird may refer to: 

 Operation Hummingbird or Night of the Long Knives, the 1934 political purge in Nazi Germany
 Operation Hummingbird (album), a 1999 studio album by Death in June